The Chiappa Little Badger is a family of Italian-made survival rifles and shotguns manufactured by Chiappa Firearms. The three basic models are chambered for .22LR, .22 WMR, .17WSM, .17HMR and 9mm Flobert.

Little Badger Survival Rifle 
The Little Badger Survival Rifle has a barrel length of 16.5 inches and measures 31 inches. It is a single shot break-action rifle and when folded, measures around 17.5 inches. The Little Badger features a wire buttstock and has a 12 round ammunition holder. Unloaded, it weighs approximately 2.9 pounds. Its safety mechanism is its hammer, which can be half-cocked to prevent accidental firing. The barrel is threaded at 28 threads per inch. It uses M1 carbine type sights and Picatinny rails on the barrel for additional sights, tac-lights, etc. An additional small section of picatinny rail sits behind the trigger, allowing the user to add a pistol grip. This model is chambered for .22LR, .22 WMR, .17WSM and .17HMR.

Little Badger Shotgun 
The Little Badger Shotgun is a garden gun version and is virtually identical to the rifle, except that it fires 9mm Flobert shot-shells from a 24-inch smooth-bore barrel, and lacks the sights and Picatinny rails.

Little Badger Deluxe Shotgun 
The Little Badger Deluxe Shotgun is another garden gun configuration. It features wooden furniture. It is 38.5 inches in overall length and fires 9mm Flobert shot-shells from a 24-inch smooth-bore barrel.

See also 
Chiappa Double Badger
Chiappa M6 Survival Gun
Chiappa Triple Crown

References

External links 

 Official website

Chiappa Firearms
Rifles of Italy
Single-shot rifles
Single-shot shotguns
Survival guns